De Boezemvriend may refer to:

De Boezemvriend (windmill)
De Boezemvriend (film) -a 1982 Dutch film